Strathkelvin and Bearsden was a parliamentary constituency represented in the House of Commons of the Parliament of the United Kingdom from 1983. In 2005, the constituency was abolished, and the area is now represented by East Dunbartonshire and Cumbernauld, Kilsyth and Kirkintilloch East.

The Scottish Parliament constituency of Strathkelvin and Bearsden, which covered the same area, continues in existence.

Boundaries
1983–1997: The Strathclyde Regional Council electoral divisions of Bearsden, Bishopbriggs, Kirkintilloch and the Bearsden & Milngavie District electoral division of Kilmardinny.

1997–2005: The Strathclyde Regional Council electoral divisions of Bearsden, Bishopbriggs, Kirkintilloch and Strathkelvin North.

Members of Parliament

Election results

Elections of the 1980s

Elections of the 1990s

Elections of the 2000s

References

Historic parliamentary constituencies in Scotland (Westminster)
Constituencies of the Parliament of the United Kingdom established in 1983
Constituencies of the Parliament of the United Kingdom disestablished in 2005
Bearsden
Politics of East Dunbartonshire